Vegetative describes vegetation. Vegetative may also refer to:

Vegetative reproduction, a type of asexual reproduction for plants
Persistent vegetative state, a condition of people with severe brain damage
Plant community, sometimes called a vegetative community, a collection of plants in a geographic area
Vegetative (or somatic) cell, a non-reproductive cell